Fall River is an  tributary of Clear Creek in Clear Creek County, Colorado. It flows from a source just south of Parry Peak to a confluence with Clear Creek west of Idaho Springs.

See also
List of rivers of Colorado

References

Rivers of Colorado
Rivers of Clear Creek County, Colorado
Tributaries of the Platte River